CRP may refer to:

Science and medicine
 C-reactive protein, an acute phase protein produced by the liver
 cAMP receptor protein (catabolite gene activator protein)
 Cysteine-rich protein, a class of small proteins
 Carbon-fiber-reinforced polymer
 Chinese restaurant process, in probability theory
 Chronic relapsing polyneuropathy, an acquired disorder of the nervous system
 Confluent and reticulated papillomatosis, a skin condition

Computing
 Common reuse principle, in software design
 Conference room pilot, in software validation

Organizations
 Calgary Regional Partnership, for planning, Alberta, Canada
 OpenSecrets, Washington, D.C., US
 Chicana Rights Project, to protect Mexican-American women's rights
 Committee to Re-elect the President (US president Richard Nixon)
 CRP-Bangladesh, Centre for the Rehabilitation of the Paralysed
 Critical Role Productions, a multimedia production company based in California.

Transport
 Aerotransportes Corporativos (Aerotranscorp, ICAO code), Mexico; see Airline codes-A
 Central Railroad of Pennsylvania (reporting mark), US
 Community rail partnership, UK
 Contra-rotating propellers, with a common axis
 Counter-rotating propellers, with separate axes
 Corpus Christi International Airport (IATA code), Texas, US

Other
 Chestnut Ridge people, a mixed-race community of Barbour County, West Virginia
 Cape Roberts Project (1997–1999), a geological drilling project in Antarctica
 Conservation Reserve Program of US Department of Agriculture
 Cost per rating point, of an advertising campaign
  is the ISO 639-2 code for creoles and pidgins